The Remington Model SP-10 is a gas-operated semi-automatic shotgun chambered for 10 gauge  Magnum shells. It was produced by Remington Arms from 1989 to 2010. The design was based on the Ithaca Mag-10.

References

External links
 Owner's Manual
 Remington SP-10 Magnum Take Down via YouTube

Remington Arms firearms
Semi-automatic shotguns of the United States
Weapons and ammunition introduced in 1989